Kasey is a unisex given name, nickname and ring name which may refer to:

Women
 Kasey Boucher (born 1990), American ice hockey player
 Kasey Brown (born 1985), Australian squash player
 Kasey Campbell, an early member of the group The Pussycat Dolls
 Kasey Carlson (born 1991), American swimmer
 Kasey Chambers (born 1976), Australian country singer-songwriter
 Kasey Evering (born 1983), Jamaican netball player
 Kasey Rogers (1925–2006), American actress born Josie Imogene Rogers 
 Kasey Smith (born 1990), Irish singer

Men
 Kasey Green (born 1979), former Australian rules footballer 
 Kasey James, ring name of former professional wrestler Kurt Sellers (born 1982)
 Kasey Kahne (born 1980), American stock car racer
 Kasey Keller (born 1969), American former soccer player
 Kasey Palmer (born 1996), English footballer
 Kasey Peters (born 1987), American football player
 Kasey Studdard (born 1984), American football offensive guard
 Kasey Wehrman (born 1977), Australian footballer

See also
 Casey (given name)

English feminine given names
English-language unisex given names